Ohad Weinberg (born 19 March 1971) is an Israeli former professional tennis player.

Weinberg competed in the junior draw at Wimbledon in 1989, where he won a match against Leander Paes. He twice featured in the singles main draw of the ATP Tour tournament in Tel Aviv and reached a best world ranking of 314.

ATP Challenger finals

Doubles: 1 (0–1)

References

External links
 
 

1971 births
Living people
Israeli male tennis players